The 1934 All-Ireland Senior Camogie Championship was the high point of the 1934 season in Camogie. The championship was won by Cork, who defeated Louth by an eight-point margin in the final.

Structure
After two championships had been run on an open draw basis, provincial championships were introduced in 1934, Cork defeated Limerick, Kerry and Waterford to win the Munster championship, Louth defeated Laois (6–4 to nil), Dublin, Kilkenny and Meath to claim the Leinster title, Galway and Antrim won their first provincial championships.

Final
Kathleen Hanratty had already acquired the nickname as camogie's Lory Meagher by the time the final was played, "her rising and striking was a treat to witness" the Irish Press reported, commenting she was the most skilled player on the field. Cork had an early goal from a 25 by Kitty McCarthy to take a 1–2 to 0–2 half time lead, Betty Riordan and Kate Dunlea (var. Kathleen Delea) added Cork goals early in the second half.

Máire Ní Cheallaigh wrote in the Irish Press:
Yesterday at Croke Park 3,000 spectators were treated to a high class game which never lost interest to the end. The teams played with great dash and though Louth were the more spectacular, Cork were better strikers and had a sound forward line.

Presentation
After the match Agnes O'Farrelly presented the O'Duffy Cup to Cork and William O'Reilly of the New Ireland Assurance Company presented the Leinster Cup to Louth. The 15-year-old Betty Riordan was the youngest player to win an All-Ireland senior medal.

Aftermath
Cork forward Mary Kenneally was a sister of John Kenneally, who won an All-Ireland senior hurling medal in 1929. Monica Cotter later known as Monica 'Girlie' Hegarty, played golf for Ireland and went on to become president of the ILGU.

Championship results

Final stages

 
 Match Rules
50 minutes
Replay if scores level
Maximum of 3 substitutions

See also
 All-Ireland Senior Hurling Championship
 Wikipedia List of Camogie players
 National Camogie League
 Camogie All Stars Awards
 Ashbourne Cup

References

External links
 Camogie Association
 Historical reports of All Ireland finals
 All-Ireland Senior Camogie Championship: Roll of Honour
 Camogie on facebook
 Camogie on GAA Oral History Project

1934 in camogie
1934